The existence and distinctiveness of the Macedonian language is disputed in Bulgaria and the name of the language was disputed by Greece. By signing the Prespa Agreement, Greece accepted the name "Macedonian language" in reference to the official language of North Macedonia.

Macedonian dialects form a continuum with Bulgarian dialects forming the Eastern South Slavic sub-group; they in turn form a broader continuum with Serbo-Croatian through the transitional Torlakian dialects. Throughout history Macedonian has been often referred to as a variant of Bulgarian. It was standardized in Yugoslavia in 1945 based on the central-western dialects of the region of Macedonia. Macedonian was recognized as a minority language in Bulgaria from 1946 to 1948. Though, it was subsequently described in Bulgaria again as a dialect or regional norm of Bulgarian.

Although Bulgaria was the first country to recognize the independence of the Republic of Macedonia in 1991, most of its academics, as well as the general public, continue to regard the language spoken there as a form of Bulgarian. However, after years of diplomatic impasse caused by this academic dispute, in 1999 the Bulgarian government settled the language issue by signing a Joint Declaration which used the euphemistic formulation: in Macedonian, pursuant to Constitution of the Republic of Macedonia, and in Bulgarian, pursuant the Constitution of the Republic of Bulgaria. Nevertheless, the Bulgarian government continues to deny Macedonian as a separate language. This issue was one of the main reasons for which the Bulgarian government has hindered accession of North Macedonia to the European Union.

Overview of issues

Recognition 

Politicians and scholars from North Macedonia, Bulgaria and Greece often have opposing views about the existence and distinctiveness of Macedonian. Through history and especially before its codification, Macedonian has been variously referred to as a variant of Bulgarian, Serbian or a distinct language of its own. Historically, after its codification, the use of the language has been a subject of different views in Serbia, Bulgaria and Greece. In the interwar period, Macedonian was treated as a South Serbian dialect in Yugoslavia, in accordance with claims made in the 19th century. The government permitted its use in dialectal literature. The 1940s saw opposing views on Macedonian in Bulgaria; while its existence was recognized in 1946-47 and allowed as the language of instruction in schools in Pirin Macedonia, the period after 1948 saw its rejection and restricted domestic use.

Until 1999, Macedonian had never been recognized as a minority language in Greece, and attempts to have Macedonian-language books introduced in education have failed. For instance, a Macedonian primer Abecedar was published in 1925 in Athens, but was never used and eventually most copies were destroyed. Professor Christina Kramer argues that Greek policies have largely been based on denying connection between the Macedonian codified standard and that of the Slavophone minority in the country and sees it as "clearly directed towards the elimination of Macedonian". The number of speakers of Macedonian in Greece has been difficult to establish since part of the Slavophone Greek population is also considered speakers of Bulgarian by Bulgarian linguists. In recent years, there have been attempts to have the language recognized as a minority language in Greece. In Albania, Macedonian was recognized after 1946 and mother-tongue instructions were offered in some village schools until grade four.

Autonomous language dispute
Bulgarian scholars have and continue to widely consider Macedonian part of the Bulgarian dialect area. In many Bulgarian and international sources before the World War II, the Eastern South Slavic dialect continuum covering the area of today's North Macedonia and Northern Greece was referred to as a group of Bulgarian dialects. Some scholars argue that the idea of linguistic separatism emerged in the late 19th century with the advent of Macedonian nationalism and the need for a separate Macedonian standard language subsequently appeared in the early 20th century. Local variants used to name the language were also balgàrtzki, bùgarski or bugàrski; i.e. Bulgarian.

Although Bulgaria was the first country to recognize the independence of the Republic of Macedonia, most of its academics, as well as the general public, regarded the language spoken there as a form of Bulgarian. Dialect experts of the Bulgarian refer to Macedonian as  i.e.  Macedonian linguistic norm of the Bulgarian language. During Communist era Macedonian was recognized as a minority language in Bulgaria from 1946 to 1948, though, it was subsequently described again as a dialect or regional norm of Bulgarian. Bulgarian government signed in 1956 an Agreement with Yugoslavia for mutual legal defense, where Macedonian is named along with Bulgarian, Serbo-Croat, and Slovene as one of the languages to be used officially for legal matters. Nevertheless in the same year Bulgaria revoked finally its recognition of Macedonian nationhood and language and resumed implicitly its prewar position. In 1999 the government in Sofia signed a Joint Declaration in the official languages of the two countries, marking the first time it agreed to sign a bilateral agreement written in Macedonian. As of 2019, disputes regarding the language and its origins are ongoing in academic and political circles in the countries. Macedonian is still widely regarded as a dialect by Bulgarian scholars, historians and politicians alike including the Government of Bulgaria and the Bulgarian Academy of Sciences, which denies the existence of a separate Macedonian language and declares it a written regional form of the Bulgarian language. Similar sentiments are also expressed by the majority of the Bulgarian population. The current international consensus outside of Bulgaria is that Macedonian is an autonomous language within the Eastern South Slavic dialect continuum. As such, the language is recognized by 138 member states of the United Nations.

Naming dispute

The Greek scientific and local community was opposed to using the denomination Macedonian to refer to the language in light of the Greek-Macedonian naming dispute. The term is often avoided in the Greek context, and vehemently rejected by most Greeks, for whom Macedonian has very different connotations. Instead, the language is often called simply "Slavic" or "Slavomacedonian" (translated to "Macedonian Slavic" in English). Speakers themselves variously refer to their language as makedonski, makedoniski ("Macedonian"), slaviká ("Slavic"), dópia or entópia ("local/indigenous [language]"), balgàrtzki (Bulgarian) or "Macedonian" in some parts of the region of Kastoria, bògartski ("Bulgarian") in some parts of Dolna Prespa  along with naši ("our own") and stariski ("old"). With the Prespa agreement signed in 2018 between the Government of North Macedonia and the Government of Greece, the latter country accepted the use of the adjective Macedonian to refer to the language using a footnote to describe it as Slavic.

Historical overview 

Bulgarian ethnos in Macedonia existed long before the earliest articulations of the idea that Macedonian Slavs might form a separate ethnic group from the Bulgarians in Danubian Bulgaria and Thrace. Throughout the period of Ottoman rule, the Slav-speaking people of the geographic regions of Moesia, Thrace and Macedonia referred to their language as Bulgarian and called themselves Bulgarians. For instance, the Croatian Bosnian researcher Stjepan Verković who was a long-term teacher in Macedonia sent by the Serbian government with a special assimilatory mission wrote in the preface of his collection of Bulgarian folk songs: "I named these songs Bulgarian, and not Slavic because today when you ask any Macedonian Slav: Who are you? he immediately answers: I am Bulgarian and call my language Bulgarian…" The name "Bulgarian" for various Macedonian dialects can be seen from early vernacular texts such as the four-language dictionary of Daniil of Moschopole, the early works of Kiril Pejchinovich and Ioakim Kurchovski and some vernacular gospels written in the Greek alphabet. These written works influenced by or completely written in the Bulgarian vernacular were registered in Macedonia in the 18th and beginning of the 19th century and their authors referred to their language as Bulgarian. The first samples of Bulgarian speech and the first grammar of the modern Bulgarian language were written by the leading Serbian literator Vuk Karadžić on the basis of the Macedonian Razlog dialect. In those early years the re-emerging Bulgarian written language was still heavily influenced by Church Slavonic forms so dialectical differences were not very prominent between the Eastern and Western regions. Indeed, in those early years many Bulgarian activists sometimes even communicated in Greek in their writing.

When the Bulgarian national movement got underway in the second quarter of the 19th century some cities in Macedonia were among the first to demand education in Bulgarian and Bulgarian-speaking clerics for their churches. By the 1860s however, it was clear that the Central Balkan regions of Bulgaria were assuming leadership in linguistic and literary affairs. This was to a large extent due to the fact that the wealthy towns on both sides of the Central Balkan range were able to produce more intellectuals educated in Europe than the relatively less developed other Bulgarian regions. Consequently, when the idea that the vernacular rather than Church Slavonic should be represented in the written language gained preponderance, it was the dialects of the Central Balkan region between Veliko Tarnovo and Plovdiv that were most represented.

Some prominent Bulgarian educators from Macedonia like Parteniy Zografski and Kuzman Shapkarev called for a stronger representation of Macedonian dialects in the Bulgarian literary language but their advice was not heeded at the time and sometimes met with hostility. In the article The Macedonian Question by Petko Rachev Slaveykov, published on 18 January 1871 in the Makedoniya newspaper in Constantinople, Macedonism was criticized, his adherents were named Macedonists, and this is the earliest surviving indirect reference to it, although Slaveykov never used the word Macedonism.The term's first recorded use is from 1887 by Stojan Novaković to describe Macedonism as a potential ally for the Serbian strategy to expand its territory toward Macedonia, whose population was regarded by almost all neutral sources as Bulgarian at the time.
The consternation of certain Macedonians with what they saw as the domineering attitude of Northern Bulgarians towards their vernacular was later deftly exploited by the Serbian state, which had begun to fear the rise of Bulgarian nationalism in Macedonia.

Up until 1912/18 it was the standard Bulgarian language that most Macedonians learned (and taught) in the Exarchate schools. All activists and leaders of the Macedonian movement, including those of the left, used standard Bulgarian in documents, press publications, correspondence and memoirs and nothing indicates they viewed it as a foreign language. This is characteristic even of the members of IMRO (United) well into the 1920s and 1930s, when the idea of a distinct Macedonian nation was taking shape.

From the 1930s onwards the Bulgarian Communist Party and the Comintern sought to foster a separate Macedonian nationality and language as a means of achieving autonomy for Macedonia within a Balkan federation. Consequently, it was Bulgarian-educated Macedonians who were the first to develop a distinct Macedonian language, culture and literature. When Socialist Macedonia was formed as part of Federal Yugoslavia, these Bulgarian-trained cadres got into a conflict over the language with the more Serbian-leaning activists, who had been working within the Yugoslav Communist Party. Since the latter held most of the political power, they managed to impose their views on the direction the new language was to follow, much to the dismay of the former group. Dennis P. Hupchick, American professor of history, states that "the obviously plagiarized historical argument of the Macedonian nationalists for a separate Macedonian ethnicity could be supported only by linguistic reality, and that worked against them until the 1940s. Until a modern Macedonian literary language was mandated by the socialist-led partisan movement from Macedonia in 1944, most outside observers and linguists agreed with the Bulgarians in considering the vernacular spoken by the Macedonian Slavs as a western dialect of Bulgarian".

After 1944 the communist-dominated government sought to create a Bulgarian-Yugoslav federation (see Balkan Communist Federation) and part of this entailed giving "cultural autonomy" to the Pirin region. Consequently, Bulgarian communists recognised Macedonian as distinct from Bulgarian on 2nd Nov 1944 with a letter from the Bulgarian Workers' Party (communists) to Marshal Tito and CPY. From January 1945 the regional newspaper Pirinsko Delo printed in Bulgaria started to publish a page in Macedonian. After the Tito–Stalin split in 1948, those plans were abandoned. This date also coincided with the first claims of Bulgarian linguists as to the Serbianisation of the Macedonian. Officially Bulgaria continued to support the idea of a Macedonian unification and a Macedonian nation but within the framework of a Balkan Federation and not within Yugoslavia. However, a reversal in the Macedonisation policy was already announced in the secret April plenum of the BCP in 1956 and openly proclaimed in the plenum of 1963. 1958 was the first time that a "serious challenge" to the Macedonian position was launched by Bulgaria. These developments led to violent polemics between Yugoslav and Bulgarian scholars and sometimes reflected on the bilateral relations of the two countries.

Macedonian views 
According to the now-prevalent and official Macedonian view in the books in the Republic of North Macedonia, Macedonian was the first official language of the Slavs, thanks to the St. Cyril and St. Methodius's introduction of Slavic literacy language through the Glagolitic script, that was based on Southern Macedonian dialect from the neighbourhood of Thessaloniki, the home of the two saints. Later on, Macedonia fell under the rule of Bulgarians, and the Byzantines regarded all Slavic Macedonians as Bulgarians. According to a fringe theory, supported in North Macedonia, Tsar Samuil's realm in the Early Middle Ages was allegedly the first Macedonian Slavic state. However, Krste Misirkov, who allegedly set the principles of the Macedonian literary language in the late 19th century, stated: "We speak a Bulgarian language and we believed with Bulgaria is our strong power."

During the time of the Ottoman Empire, Serbia, Macedonia, Bulgaria, and Greece were all under Ottoman reign. During the nineteenth century, the primary source of identity was religion. Because Slavs in the geographical regions of Macedonia and Bulgaria were both Orthodox Christian and the Greek Orthodox Church was attempting to Hellenize the population, Macedonian and Bulgarian intellectuals banded together to establish a Slavic literary language in opposition to Greek. Two competing centers of literacy rose at the beginning of the nineteenth century: southwestern Macedonia and northeastern Bulgaria. These centers were different enough at every linguistic level to be competing to become the literary language. When the Bulgarian Exarchate was recognized as a millet on par with the Greek millet (on religious grounds), the designation Bulgarian was still a religious term, in opposition to Greek, and the language began to be standardized on the basis of the Bulgarian center of literacy. Intellectuals from the Macedonian center of literacy felt that their dialects were being excluded from the literary Bulgarian language. By the time the Bulgarian state gained independence in 1878, the population of Macedonia and Bulgaria was subjected to conflicting claims from the Serbian, Bulgarian, and Greek states and churches, which provided education, and a distinct Macedonian national identity was written about in print. By 1903, a separate Macedonian identity and language is solidified in the works of Krste Petkov Misirkov, who advocates for a distinct Macedonian literary language.

Bulgarian views 

In 1946 Elections for a constituent assembly in October gave the Communists a majority. The new authorities officially recognized Macedonian, but it lasted only until the Tito–Stalin split in 1948. However, from 1948 to 1963 some Bulgarian linguists still continued to recognize Macedonian as a separate Slavic language. The first big "language scandal" between Bulgaria and Macedonia happened in November 1966 when the president of the Bulgarian Association of Writers Georgi Dzagarov refused to sign an agreement for friendship and cooperation that was prepared in both Bulgarian and Macedonian. In 1993 the Bulgarian government refused to sign the first bilateral agreement with the Republic of Macedonia because the Macedonian language was mentioned in the agreement in the last clause: "This agreement is written and signed in Bulgarian and Macedonian". That started a dispute that was resolved in February 1999 when the governments of Bulgaria and Macedonia signed a Joint Declaration where in the last paragraph both governments signed the declaration in: "Bulgarian according to the constitution of Bulgaria and in Macedonian according to the constitution of Macedonia." The denial to recognize Macedonian though persisted in Bulgarian society, so in August 2017 both governments signed another Agreement for Friendship with a clause that mentions the Macedonian language again. In the Bulgarian society there still exists a perception that Bulgaria did not and does not recognize Macedonian as a distinct language.

Although Bulgaria was the first country to recognize the independence of the Republic of Macedonia, most of its academics, as well as the general public, regard the language spoken there as a form of Bulgarian. However, after years of diplomatic impasse caused by an academic dispute, in 1999 the government in Sofia solved the problem with the Macedonian language under the formula: "the official language of the country (Republic of Macedonia) in accordance with its constitution".

Most Bulgarian linguists consider the Slavic dialects spoken in the region of Macedonia as a part of the Bulgarian dialect area. Numerous shared features of these dialects with Bulgarian are cited as proof. Bulgarian scholars also claim that the overwhelming majority of the Macedonian population had no consciousness of a Macedonian language separate from Bulgarian prior to 1945. Russian scholars cite the early references to the language in Slavic literature from the middle of the 10th century to the end of the 19th century as "bulgarski" or "bolgarski" as proof of that claim. From that, the conclusion is drawn that modern standard Macedonian is not a language separate from Bulgarian either but just another written "norm" based on a set of Bulgarian dialects. See also dialect and dialect continuum.

Moreover, Bulgarian linguists assert that the Macedonian and Yugoslav linguists who were involved in codifying the new language artificially introduced differences from literary Bulgarian to bring it closer to Serbian. They are also said to have resorted to falsifications and deliberate misinterpretations of history and documents in order to further the claim that there was a consciousness of a separate Macedonian ethnicity before 1944. Although the original aim of the codifiers of Macedonian was to distance it from both Bulgarian and Serbian, Bulgarians today view standard Macedonian as heavily Serbianised, especially with regards to its vocabulary. Bulgarian scholars such as Kosta Tsrnushanov claim there are several ways in which standard Macedonian was influenced by Serbian. Venko Markovski, writer, poet and Communist politician from the region of Macedonia, who in 1945 participated in the Commission for the Creation of the Macedonian Alphabet and once wrote in Macedonian and published what was the first contemporary book written in standardized Macedonian, stated in an interview for Bulgarian National Television only seven days prior to his death, that ethnic Macedonians and the Macedonian language do not exist and that they were a result of Comintern manipulation. Part of the Bulgarian scholars and people hold the view that Macedonian is one of three "norms" of the Bulgarian language, the other two being standard Bulgarian and the language of the Banat Bulgarians. This formulation was detailed in 1978 in a document of the Bulgarian Academy of Sciences entitled "The Unity of the Bulgarian Language Today and in the Past". Although Bulgaria was the first country to recognize the independence of the Republic of Macedonia, it has not recognized Macedonian as a unique language since it reversed its recognition of the language and ethnic group in the late 1950s. This was a major obstacle to the development of diplomatic relations between the two countries until a compromise solution was worked out in 1999.

Greek views 

From the Greek point of view, there is only one true meaning for the term Macedonia, and that is in reference to ancient Macedon and the modern Greek region of Macedonia. Therefore Greeks were objecting to the use of the "Macedonian" name in reference to the modern Slavic language, calling it "Slavomacedonian", a term coined by some members of the Slavic-speaking community of northern Greece itself and used by Georgi Pulevski in his book "A Dictionary of Three languages".

Demetrius Andreas Floudas, Senior Associate of Hughes Hall, Cambridge, explains that it was only in 1944 that Josip Broz Tito, in order to increase his regional influence, gave to the southernmost province of Yugoslavia (officially known as Vardarska banovina under the banate regional nomenclature) the new name of People's Republic of Macedonia. At the same time, in a "political master-stroke", the local language - which was until then held to be a western Bulgarian dialect - was unilaterally christened "Macedonian" and became one of Yugoslavia's official languages. Greece similarly rejects the former name "Republic of Macedonia", seeing it as an implicit territorial claim on the whole of the region.

Books have been published in Greece which purport to expose the alleged artificial character of Macedonian.

On 3 June 2018, the Greek Minister of Shipping and Island Policy Panagiotis Kouroublis, acknowledged that Greece had fully recognized the term "Macedonian language" for the modern Slavic language, since the 1977 UN Conference on the Standardization of Geographical Names, a fact confirmed on 6 June by the Greek Foreign Minister Nikos Kotzias, who stated that the language was recognized by the New Democracy-led government of that time. Kotzias also revealed classified documents confirming the use of the term "Macedonian Language" by the past governments of Greece, as well as pointing out to official statements of the Greek Prime Minister Evangelos Averoff who in 1954 and 1959 used the term "Macedonian language" to refer to the South Slavic language. New Democracy denied these claims, noting that the 1977 UN document states clearly that the terminology used thereof (i.e. the characterization of the languages) does not imply any opinion of the General Secretariat of the UN regarding the legal status of any country, territory, borders etc. Further, New Democracy stated that in 2007 and 2012, as governing party, included Greece's objections in the relevant UN documents.

On 12 June 2018, North Macedonia's Prime Minister Zoran Zaev, announced that the recognition of Macedonian by Greece is reaffirmed in the Prespa agreement. Within Greece itself however, the term "Slavomacedonian" (Σλαβομακεδονικα) is most commonly used.

Serbian views 
Serbia officially recognises Macedonian as a separate language from Bulgarian. In the 2002 census c.26,000 people declared themselves as Macedonians.

Views of linguists 

Expressing a pro-Macedonian view is Horace Lunt, a Harvard professor, who wrote the first English language grammar of Macedonian in the early 1950s: "Bulgarian scholars, who argue that the concept of a Macedonian language was unknown before World War II, or who continue to claim that a Macedonian language does not exist look not only dishonest, but silly, while Greek scholars who make similar claims are displaying arrogant ignorance of their Slavic neighbours"; (Lunt 1984:110, 120). Similarly, Loring Danforth, a professor of anthropology at Bates College in Lewiston, Maine, addresses the stance of linguists, who attribute the origin of the Macedonian language to their will, stressing that all languages in the standardisation process have a certain political and historical context to them and the fact that the Macedonian language had a political context in which it was standardised doesn't mean it is not a language.

Expressing a pro-Bulgarian view, Italian linguist Vittore Pisani stated "the Macedonian language is actually an artifact produced for primarily political reasons". German linguist Friedrich Scholz argues that the Macedonian national consciousness and from that conscientious promotion of Macedonian as a written language first appears just in the beginning of the twentieth century and is strengthened particularly during the years between the two world wars. Austrian linguist Otto Kronsteiner states that the Macedonian linguists artificially introduced differences from the literary Bulgarian language to bring Macedonian closer to Serbian, jesting that the Macedonian language is a Bulgarian one, but written on a Serbian typewriter. According to the Encyclopedia of Language and Linguistics (ed. linguist Ronald E. Asher), Macedonian can be called a Bulgarian dialect, as structurally it is most similar to Bulgarian.

See also 
 A language is a dialect with an army and navy
 Accession of North Macedonia to the European Union
 Bulgarian nationalism 
 Comparison of standard Bosnian, Croatian, Montenegrin and Serbian
 Controversy over ethnic and linguistic identity in Moldova
 Controversy over ethnic and linguistic identity in Montenegro
 Declaration on the Common Language
 Declaration on the Name and Status of the Croatian Literary Language
 Digraphia
 Hindi–Urdu controversy
 Latinisation in the Soviet Union
 Macedonian nationalism (including Macedonism)
 Pluricentric language
 Yugoslavism
 Spread of the Latin script

References

External links 
 Otto Kronsteiner, The Fathering of the Macedonian Literary Language
 James F. Clarke, Macedonia from S. S. Cyril and Methodius to Horace Lunt and Blazhe Koneski: Language and Nationality
 Коста Църнушанов, "Сърбизиране на македонския казионен "литeратурен език"" (част I) 
 Коста Църнушанов, "Сърбизиране на македонския казионен "литeратурен език"" (част II) 
 Ив. Кочев и Ив. Александров, ДОКУМЕНТИ ЗА СЪЧИНЯВАНЕТО НА МАКЕДОНСКИЯ КНИЖОВЕН ЕЗИК 
 И. И. Калиганов, "Размышления о македонском "срезе" палеоболгаристики" 
 А.М.Селищев, "Македонские говоры"
 Любомир Андрейчин, Из историята на нашето езиково строителство 
 Стојан Киселиновски "Кодификација на македонскиот литературен јазик", Дневник, 1339, сабота, 18 март 2006. 
 

Macedonian language
Bulgarian language
Politics of North Macedonia
Bulgaria–North Macedonia relations
Greece–North Macedonia relations
Linguistic controversies
Point of view